Antietam Lake is a reservoir located in Berks County, Pennsylvania entirely within the Antietam Lake Park. The lake was formerly owned by the city of Reading. It was purchased by Berks County in 2006. The lake is surrounded by 643 acres of park land.

Historical Information
A beautiful waterfall formed by the dam can be seen on your way into Antietam Lake Park. Also, a historical spring house is located in the park. It is believed to be over one-hundred fifty years old and is still intact. It is one of the main historical attractions in the park. In addition, a historical home on the property known as Bingaman House has been restored and is an environmental educational center.

Geographical Information
The lake is formed by the disbandment of the Antietam Creek. The lake is stocked annually with trout.

References

External links

Reservoirs in Pennsylvania
Protected areas of Berks County, Pennsylvania
Bodies of water of Berks County, Pennsylvania